Segundo Víctor Aurelio Chomón y Ruiz  (also Chomont or Chaumont ; 17 October 1871 – 2 May 1929) was a pioneering Spanish film director, cinematographer and screenwriter. He produced many short films in France while working for Pathé Frères and has been compared to Georges Méliès, due to his frequent camera tricks and optical illusions. He is regarded as the most significant Spanish silent film director in an international context.

Biography
Born in Aragon (Spain), Segundo de Chomón reportedly got into film through the efforts of his French actress wife, Julienne Mathieu, who appeared in early Pathé Frères productions and worked in some special effects Parisian workshops like Thuillier's studio. Around 1900 he became an agent for Pathé Frères in Spain, publicizing and distributing their films out of Barcelona. In 1901, Chomón began producing actuality films in Spain on an independent basis and distributing them through Pathé; his first trick film was Gulliver en el país de los gigantes (1903). Chomón and his wife also specialized in producing stencil colored film prints and were one of the developers of the Pathéchrome process, patented by Pathé in 1905. Charles Pathé noted the quality of Chomón's trick films and, from 1903, began to support these efforts with the desire of competing with Georges Méliès.

Chomón was expert enough at making trick films and had proven himself so valuable to Pathé that in 1905 he and Mathieu moved from Barcelona to Paris, and Chomón was placed in charge of a color stencilling shop in addition to his periodic duties as a director. Through 1907, Chomón worked in close collaboration with Pathé's top director, Ferdinand Zecca; the partnership worked so well that in 1907 Zecca selected Chomón to co-direct a major project, the remake of Zecca's own 1903 Vie et Passion de Notre Seigneur Jésus Christ. Shortly afterward, Zecca moved into an executive position at Pathé and did little direction from that time; Chomón's most productive years as a filmmaker lasted from 1907 to 1912, a period during which Méliès' production went into a steep decline. Chomón often worked with other directors; in addition to Zecca he collaborated with Gaston Velle, Juan Fuster, Alberto Capellani and Émile Cohl. Although he remained with Pathé, in 1910 Chomón returned to Barcelona and started an independent production company, Iberico Films, which proved short-lived.

In 1912, Chómon accepted an invitation to make films in Italy. In addition to his own films, he worked on special effects on the films of others, notably Giovanni Pastrone's epic Cabiria (1914). Pastrone returned the favor in 1917 through collaborating on Chomón's last directorial effort, La guerra e il sogno di Momi; Chomón's own films had become less frequent after his move to Italy, and he had primarily worked in visual effects and cinematography in these years. After 1917, Chomón principally worked on creating visual effects for the films of others, including Guido Brignone's Maciste in Hell (1925) and Abel Gance's Napoléon (1927). Towards the end of his life, Chomón collaborated with Swiss inventor Ernest Zollinger (ex-Pathé, ex-Itala Films) to develop a photographic, two-color film process. Chomón was planning to get back into full-time film production on his own when he died, suddenly, of a heart attack at age 57.

Legacy
The very year that Chomón died, the Surrealists organized a soirée that would rehabilitate the artistic reputation of Georges Méliès and to begin the long process of recovering his films. Chomón was effectively forgotten in the wake of his death, though over time silent film collectors began to recognize some of his shorts and he was dubbed "The Spanish Méliès" in English-speaking lands. Two of his films, Le spectre rouge (1907) and Hôtel électrique (1908), persistently circulated in the collector's market and were also circulated by the Museum of Modern Art film library; the first as an example of stencilled color and the second as a Pathé Frères film by an unknown director. The Italian film Cabiria (where he was director of photography & special FX) featured what may have been the first "dolly shot" in the movies, utilizing a device built by Chomón. Finally, recognition came to Chomón in his home country, as the Filmoteca de Catalunya established a special division with the purpose of collecting and cataloguing what was left of his output; a DVD collection in PAL format with 31 films, Segundo Chomón: Le Cine de la Fantasia, was released by the Filmoteca in 2010. Many of de Chomon's Parisian Pathé Frères films have been recovered, but his Spanish and Italian productions have proven more elusive.

Comparisons of Chomón's work with that of Georges Méliès is inevitable, with those in Chomón's court insisting that he was a better filmmaker, whereas those on Méliès' side insist that Chomón was a mere imitator. While it is hard to top Méliès' achievements in discovering basic editing and in his eye-popping production designs, Chomon was a slightly more modern filmmaker than Méliès. Chomón relied extensively on animation, a field in which he was a pioneer and a technique Georges Méliès seldom, if ever, used. Moreover, Chomón offered slight improvements on some techniques that Méliès already had tried, such as in Les Kiriki, acrobates japonais (1907). Chomón's work was also more expansive in terms of genre than that of Méliès; he started in actuality films and continued working in this field after the transition to documentary and was also employed on standard dramatic features as well. Méliès began making actualities also, in 1896, but after discovering and developing the trick film and fantasy genres, he stayed put. Nevertheless, it is for his trick films that Chomón will be best remembered; Spain honored him with a postage stamp in 1994.  Chomón's film Armures Mystérieuses (The Mysterious Armor or The Wonderful Armor) was preserved by the Academy Film Archive in 2010.

Film historian Tom Gunning has suggested that Luis Buñuel and/or Salvador Dalí were familiar with Chomón's Superstition andalouse (1912) years before making their experimental film Un Chien andalou in 1929.

Filmography

1901: Bajada de Montserrat
1902: Choque de trenes
1902: Danse des Ouléd-Naïd
1902: Loie Fuller
1902: Montserrat
1903: Pulgarcito
1903: Gulliver en el país de los Gigantes
1903: Los héroes del sitio de Zaragoza
1904: Barcelone, Le parc au crépuscule
1904: El heredero de Casa Pruna
1906: Le roi des dollars
1906: L'obsession du billard
1906: Le sorcier arabe
1906: Les cent trucs
1906: Le courant électrique
1906: La maison hantée (1906)
1906: La fée aux pigeons
1906: La dernière sorcière
1906: Plongeur fantastique
1906: L'homme aux trente-six têtes
1906: Le théâtre de Bob
1906: La maison hantée
1906: Ah! La barbe
1906: Hallucination musicale
1906: L’obsession de l’or
1906: Le mariage du roi Alphonse XIII
1906: Le troubadour1906: L'antre de la sorcière1906: Les roses magiques1907: La Passion de Jésus1907: Métempsycose1907: Les tulipes1907: Le scarabée d'or1907: Le charmeur1907: Le bailleur1907: Les flammes diaboliques1907: Le parapluie fantastique1907: Fantaisies endiablées1907: Le spectre rouge1907: Les œufs de Pâques1907: La fée des roches noires1907: Les chrysanthèmes1907: Le sculpteur express1907: Silhouettes animées1907: Armures mystérieuses1907: Les verres enchantés1907: La boîte à cigares1907: Satan s'amuse1907: L'étang enchanté1907: Ali Baba et les quarante voleurs1907: La forge infernale1907: En avant la musique1907: La maison morcelée1907: Les Kiriki, acrobates japonais1907: Les glaces merveilleuses1907: Le baiser de la sorcière1907: Métempsycose1907: Le scarabée d'or1907: La maison hantée
1908: La table magique
1908: Voyage original
1908: Les œufs merveilleux
1908: L'araignée d'or
1908: Création de la serpentine
1908: Voyage oriental
1908: Le secret de la sorcière
1908: Le rêve des marmitons
1908: Les affiches animées
1908: Sculpteur moderne
1908: Voyage dans la lune
1908: Chiffonniers et caricaturistes
1908: Le rêve de Toula
1908: La grenouille
1908: Les lunatiques
1908: L'auberge tranquille
1908: L'insaisissable pickpocket
1908: Les papillons japonais
1908: La légende du fantôme
1908: Les flammes mystérieuses
1908: Déménagement magnétique
1908: Les tribulations du roi Tétaclaque
1908: Hôtel électrique
1908: L'aspirateur
1908: Les grotesques
1908: Cuisine magnétique
1908: Le chevalier mystère
1908: Hôtel électrique
1908: L'écran magique
1908: La grotte des esprits
1908: Mes fleurs
1908: Magie moderne
1908: L'abeille et la rose
1908: Le voleur mystérieux
1908: Les pantins de Misole
1908: Les ombres chinoises
1908: Les jouets vivants
1908: La maison ensorcelée
1909: Symphonie bizarre
1909: Le voleur invisible
1909: La liquéfaction des corps
1909: Les cocottes en papier
1909: Le petit Poucet
1909: L'âne de la sorcière
1909: La forge du diable
1909: Les cadeaux de la fée
1909: Le jeu de patience
1909: Farce macabre
1909: Cauchemar et doux rêves
1909: Les têtes fantastiques
1909: Voyage sur la planète Jupiter
1909: La leçon de musique
1909: Pickpock ne craint pas les entraves
1909: Une excursion incohérente
1909: Les guirlandes merveilleuses
1909: Mars
1909: Le Roi des aulnes
1909: Voyage au centre de la Terre
1910: Amor Gitano
1910: La expiación
1910: El puente de la muerte
1910: Venganza de un carbonero
1910: La fecha de Pepín
1910: La fatalidad
1910: El ejemplo
1910: Pragmática real
1910: Justicias del rey don Pedro
1910: La manta del caballo
1910: La hija del guardacostas
1910: La gratitud de las flores
1910: Flores y perlas
1910: Los guapos
1910: El puñao de rosas
1910: Las carceleras
1910: La tempranica
1910: El pobre Valbuena
1910: Lucha fratricida o Nobleza Aragonesa
1910: Los pobres de levita
1910: Los dulces de Arturo
1910: Una farsa de Colás
1910: Flema inglesa
1910: Gerona: la Venecia española
1910: La heroica Zaragoza.
1911: Pulgarcito
1912: El talismán del vagabundo
1912: Soñar despierto
1912 : Métamorphoses
1916 : La guerra e il sogno di Momi, directed with Giovanni Pastrone

Notes

References
(fr) Beaudet, Louise, À la recherche de Segundo de Chomón : pionnier du cinéma, Annecy, Les Éditions du lac, 1985
 Sánchez Vidal, Agustín, Realizadores aragoneses, Zaragoza, Caja de Ahorros de la Inmaculada-Edelvives, 1999. 
 Sánchez Vidal, Agustín, El cine de Chomón, Zaragoza, Caja de Ahorros de la Inmaculada, 1992.
 Tharrats, Juan Gabriel, Los 500 filmes de Segundo de Chomón, Universidad de Zaragoza, Prensas Universitarias, 1988.
(fr) Tharrats, Juan Gabriel, Segundo de Chomón : un pionnier méconnu du cinéma européen, Paris, L'Harmattan, 2009
 Tharrats, Juan Gabriel, Inolvidable Chomón, Filmoteca regional de Murcia, 1990, 59 p.

External links

 
 
 
 Eleanor McKeown, "The Spanish Weirdness of Segundo de Chomón" Electric Sheep 
 Paghat the Ratgirl, Wild Realm Review: Films of Segundo de Chomón 
 Anthology Film Archives, "The Singular Segundo de Chomón" 
 Europa Film Treasures, "Les Kirikis, acrobates japonaises 
 
 

1871 births
1929 deaths
Spanish film directors
Spanish cinematographers
Spanish male screenwriters
Film directors from Aragon
French film directors
Fantasy film directors
Cinema pioneers
People from Teruel
20th-century Spanish screenwriters
20th-century Spanish male writers